Nosratabad (also Romanized as Noşratābād) is a village in Tuskacheshmeh Rural District, in the Central District of Galugah County, Mazandaran Province, Iran. At the 2006 census, its population was 250, in 70 families.

References 

Populated places in Galugah County